This is a list of burial places of prime ministers of the United Kingdom.

Prime ministers are typically buried or interred in a place associated with them or, traditionally, their aristocratic family seat. Eight prime ministers have been buried in Westminster Abbey, and several more have declined that honour; 14 prime ministers have been buried in London. The majority of prime ministers (40) have been buried in England, with six in Scotland, and one, David Lloyd George, in Wales. All prime ministers have been buried on the British mainland except two, John Stuart, 3rd Earl of Bute and Harold Wilson. Eight prime ministers who held office in the 20th century were cremated before their ashes were buried or scattered elsewhere.

See also

List of prime ministers of the United Kingdom
Burial places of British royalty

Notes

References

; cited as WalODNB.
; cited as CompODNB.
; cited as PelODNB.
; cited as ThPelODNB.
; cited as CavODNB.
; cited as ButeODNB.
; cited as GrenODNB.
; cited as RockODNB.
; cited as GrafODNB.
; cited as CampBanODNB.
; cited as RoseODNB.
; cited as NorODNB.
; cited as PortODNB.
; cited as GrenBarODNB.
; cited as SpenODNB.
; cited as CanODNB.
; cited as PeelODNB.
; cited as GodeODNB.
; cited as RussODNB.
; cited as PalmODNB.

 

Burial places
United Kingdom
Burials in the United Kingdom
United Kingdom